2052 Tamriko, provisional designation , is a stony Eoan asteroid from the outer regions of the asteroid belt, approximately 27 kilometers in diameter. It was discovered on 24 October 1976, by Richard Martin West at ESO's La Silla Observatory in northern Chile. The asteroid was named after the discoverer's wife Tamara West.

Orbit and classification 

Tamriko is a member of the Eos family, the largest asteroid family in the outer main belt consisting of nearly 10,000 asteroids. It orbits the Sun in the outer main-belt at a distance of 2.8–3.3 AU once every 5 years and 3 months (1,905 days). Its orbit has an eccentricity of 0.08 and an inclination of 10° with respect to the ecliptic.

Its observation arc begins 24 years prior to the official discovery observation, with its identification  at Goethe Link Observatory in March 1952.

Physical characteristics 

In the Tholen classification, Tamriko is a stony S-type asteroid.

Rotation period 

Between 2001 and 2011, four rotational lightcurve of Tamriko were obtained from photometric observations by Edwin Sheridan, Pierre Antonini, Laurent Bernasconi and Brian Warner. Lightcurve analysis gave a rotation period between 7.462 and 7.471 hours with a brightness variation between 0.11 and 0.15 magnitude.

Diameter and albedo 

According to the surveys carried out by the Infrared Astronomical Satellite IRAS, the Japanese Akari satellite, and NASA's Wide-field Infrared Survey Explorer with its subsequent NEOWISE mission, Tamriko measures between 26.799 and 30.45 kilometers in diameter and its surface has an albedo between 0.1225 and 0.158.

The Collaborative Asteroid Lightcurve Link adopts the results obtained by IRAS, that is, a standard albedo of 0.1225 and a diameter of 30.45 kilometers with an absolute magnitude of 10.48.

Naming 

This minor planet was named for Tamara West, wife of the discoverer Richard Martin West. The official  was published by the Minor Planet Center on 1 July 1979.

Notes

References

External links 
 Asteroid Lightcurve Database (LCDB), query form (info )
 Dictionary of Minor Planet Names, Google books
 Asteroids and comets rotation curves, CdR – Observatoire de Genève, Raoul Behrend
 Discovery Circumstances: Numbered Minor Planets (1)-(5000) – Minor Planet Center
 
 

002052
Discoveries by Richard Martin West
Named minor planets
002052
19761024